Thomas Gordon Hayes (January 5, 1844 – August 27, 1915) was a Democratic politician and lawyer, who served as the United States District Attorney for Maryland from 1886 to 1890 and as the Mayor of Baltimore from 1899 to 1903.

Biography 
Born in Anne Arundel County, Maryland, Hayes served in the 17th Virginia Infantry and in the unit that become the 10th Virginia Cavalry as a young man before entering Virginia Military Institute in January 1862. When the Civil War began, Hayes served in the Confederate army along with 247 VMI cadets who fought at the Battle of New Market. After the end of the Civil War, he came to Baltimore but soon returned to Virginia where he graduated in 1867 and started as an assistant professor of mathematics. Hayes later moved to the Kentucky Military Institute, near Frankfort, where her served as a professor of natural sciences. While living in Kentucky, Hayes studied law and was admitted to the bar in Kentucky, before returning to Baltimore in 1872.

Hayes was elected to the Maryland House of Delegates, serving in the 1880 session, and served in the Maryland Senate in 1884 and 1886. On June 1, 1886, President Grover Cleveland appointed Hayes as the United States District Attorney for Maryland. Hayes was elected as Mayor of Baltimore on May 2, 1899, defeating the incumbent Republican Mayor William T. Malster by 8,748 votes. Hayes lost in the Democratic primary to Robert McLane who succeeded him as Mayor in 1903.

Thomas G. Hayes died on August 27, 1915. A statue of Hayes by Edward Berge was unveiled at the Baltimore City Hall on May 5, 1919.

See also 
 United States Attorney for the District of Maryland

References

External links 
 

1844 births
1915 deaths
Democratic Party Maryland state senators
Mayors of Baltimore
Democratic Party members of the Maryland House of Delegates
United States Attorneys for the District of Maryland
19th-century American politicians